Ruthless for Life is the third album by rapper MC Ren, released June 30, 1998, on Ruthless Records and distributed by Epic Records.

Background
Ruthless for Life was MC Ren's last album on Ruthless Records. The album is dedicated to the deceased and to MC Ren's good friend Eazy-E, the album is also dedicated to his home-town Compton. The album was the last album from MC Ren for the next 11 years.

Commercial Performance
The album debuted on #100 on the Billboard top 200 with first week sales of 21,000 copies, the album sold to-date 175,000 copies in the US and over 220,000 copies worldwide.

Track listing

Chart performance

References 

MC Ren albums
1998 albums
Ruthless Records albums
Epic Records albums